Roman Valeriyovych Shcherbatiuk  (born 26 June 1997) is a Ukrainian kickboxer.

Background
Shcherbatiuk studied at the Cherkasy Secondary School No. 7. He graduated from the Institute of Physical Culture, Sports and Health of the Cherkasy National University.

Kickboxing career
Shcherbatiuk faced Khasankhon Baratov for the WAKO Intercontinental Super Heavyweight (+91 kg) K-1 title at 2021 Uzbek Open on June 16, 2021. He won the fight by a fourth-round knockout.

In April 2022, following the Russian invasion of Ukraine, Shcherbatiuk joined the 118th Territorial Defense Brigade and took part in the Battle of Popasna. He was allowed to leave the armed forces in June to take part in the 2022 World Games, where he competed in the -91 kg kickboxing division. He captured the bronze medal, having lost to Bahram Rajabzadeh in the semifinals. In August 2022, he was awarded the "For Labor and Victory" medal, a state award given by the president of Ukraine to individuals for significant merits in strengthening Ukrainian statehood, courage and self-sacrifice shown in the protection of the sovereignty and territorial integrity of Ukraine.

Championships and accomplishments

Professional
World Association of Kickboxing Organizations
2021 WAKO Intercontinental Super Heavyweight (+91 kg) K-1 Championship

Amateur
World Association of Kickboxing Organizations
2021 WAKO World Championship Super Heavyweight (+91 kg) K-1 
2019 WAKO World Championship Heavyweight (-91 kg) K-1 
2018 WAKO European Championship Heavyweight (-91 kg) K-1 
European University Sports Association
2019 EUSA Combat Championship (-84 kg) K-1

Fight record
{{Kickboxing record start||norec=y|title=Kickboxing record|record=1 Win (1 (T)KO's), 0 Losses, 1 Draw}}
|-
|-  style="text-align:center; background:#cfc"
| 2021-06-16 || Win ||align=left| Khasankhon Baratov || 2021 Uzbek Open || Tashkent, Uzbekistan || KO (Low kick) || 4 || 1:12 
|-
! style=background:white colspan=9 |
|-
|-  style="text-align:center; background:#c5d2ea"
| 2017 || Draw ||align=left| Ersultan Bekenov || Steppe Fighters || Astana, Kazakhstan || Decision || 5 || 3:00
|-
| colspan=9 | Legend:    

|-  bgcolor="#cfc"
| 2022-07-14 || Win||align=left| Pirkka Suksi  || World Games 2022, Kickboxing Bronze Medal Fight +91 kg  || Birmingham, Alabama, United States || Decision (3:0) || 3 || 2:00
|-
! style=background:white colspan=9 | 

|-  bgcolor="#fbb"
| 2022-07-13 || Loss||align=left| Bahram Rajabzadeh || World Games 2022, Kickboxing Semi Final +91 kg  || Birmingham, Alabama, United States || Decision (3:0) || 3 || 2:00

|-  bgcolor="#cfc"
| 2022-07-13 || Win||align=left| Oscar Higuera || World Games 2022, Kickboxing Quarter Final +91 kg  || Birmingham, Alabama, United States || Decision (3:0) || 3 || 2:00

|-  style="text-align:center; background:#cfc;"
| 2022-06-05 || Win ||align=left| Robert Dochod || 27th Hungarian Kickboxing World Cup, Final || Budapest, Hungary || Decision (3:0) || 3 || 2:00
|-
! style=background:white colspan=9 |
|-
|-  style="text-align:center; background:#cfc;"
| 2022-06-05 || Win ||align=left| Michal Turinsky || 27th Hungarian Kickboxing World Cup, Semifinal || Budapest, Hungary || Decision (3:0) || 3 || 2:00
|-
|-  style="text-align:center; background:#fbb;"
| 2021-10-22 || Loss ||align=left| Asadulla Nasipov || 2021 WAKO World Championship, Semifinal || Lido di Jesolo, Italy || Decision (3:0) || 3 || 2:00
|-
! style=background:white colspan=9 |
|-
|-  style="text-align:center; background:#cfc;"
| 2021-10-20 || Win ||align=left| Bahram Rajabzadeh || 2021 WAKO World Championship, Quarterfinal || Lido di Jesolo, Italy || Decision (2:1) || 3 || 2:00
|-
|-  style="text-align:center; background:#cfc;"
| 2021-10-18 || Win ||align=left| Michal Blawdziewicz || 2021 WAKO World Championship, Round of 16 || Lido di Jesolo, Italy || Decision (2:1) || 3 || 2:00
|-
|-  style="text-align:center; background:#fbb;"
| 2021-09-17 || Loss ||align=left| Michal Blawdziewicz || 26th Hungarian Kickboxing World Cup, Semifinal || Budapest, Hungary || Decision (2:1) || 3 || 2:00
|-
! style=background:white colspan=9 |
|-
|-  style="text-align:center; background:#cfc;"
| 2021-09-16 || Win ||align=left| Martin Gabl || 26th Hungarian Kickboxing World Cup, Quarterfinal || Budapest, Hungary || Decision (3:0) || 3 || 2:00
|-
|-  style="text-align:center; background:#fbb;"
| 2019-11-28 || Loss ||align=left| Michal Grzesiak || 2019 WAKO World Championship, Quarterfinal || Antalya, Turkey || Decision (2:1) || 3 || 2:00
|-
|-  style="text-align:center; background:#cfc;"
| 2019-11-26 || Win ||align=left| Viktor Vigvary || 2019 WAKO World Championship, Round of 16 || Antalya, Turkey || Decision (3:0) || 3 || 2:00
|-
|-  style="text-align:center; background:#fbb;"
| 2019-10-27 || Loss ||align=left| Sergej Maslobojev || 2018 WAKO World Championship, Final || Sarajevo, Bosnia and Herzegovina || Decision (3:0) || 3 || 2:00
|-
! style=background:white colspan=9 |
|-
|-  style="text-align:center; background:#cfc;"
| 2019-10-25 || Win ||align=left| Dmitrii Vasnaev || 2018 WAKO World Championship, Semifinal || Sarajevo, Bosnia and Herzegovina || Decision (3:0) || 3 || 2:00
|-
|-  style="text-align:center; background:#fbb;"
| 2019-08-02 || Loss ||align=left| Vida Balázs || 2019 EUSA Combat Championship, Final || Zagreb, Croatia || Decision (3:0) || 3 || 2:00
|-
! style=background:white colspan=9 |
|-
|-  style="text-align:center; background:#cfc;"
| 2019-08-02 || Win ||align=left| Simon Philip || 2019 EUSA Combat Championship, Semifinal || Zagreb, Croatia || Decision (3:0) || 3 || 2:00
|-
|-  style="text-align:center; background:#cfc;"
| 2019-08-02 || Win ||align=left| Diogo Castro || 2019 EUSA Combat Championship, Quarterfinal || Zagreb, Croatia || Decision (3:0) || 3 || 2:00
|-
|-  style="text-align:center; background:#cfc;"
| 2019-06-16 || Win ||align=left| Michał Mański || 24th Bestfighter World Cup, Final || Rimini, Italy || Decision (3:0) || 3 || 2:00
|-
! style=background:white colspan=9 |
|-
|-  style="text-align:center; background:#cfc;"
| 2019-06-15 || Win ||align=left| Piotr Wypchal || 24th Bestfighter World Cup, Semifinal || Rimini, Italy || Decision (3:0) || 3 || 2:00
|-
|-  style="text-align:center; background:#cfc;"
| 2019-05-19 || Win ||align=left| Sergiu Tihon || 25th Hungarian Kickboxing World Cup, Final || Budapest, Hungary || Decision (3:0) || 3 || 2:00
|-
! style=background:white colspan=9 |
|-
|-  style="text-align:center; background:#cfc;"
| 2019-05-18 || Win ||align=left| David Mihajlov || 25th Hungarian Kickboxing World Cup, Semifinal || Budapest, Hungary || Decision (3:0) || 3 || 2:00
|-
|-  style="text-align:center; background:#fbb;"
| 2018-10-15 || Loss ||align=left| Ahmed Krnjić || 2018 WAKO World Championship, Semifinal || Bratislava, Slovakia || Decision (2:1) || 3 || 2:00
|-
! style=background:white colspan=9 |
|-
|-  style="text-align:center; background:#cfc;"
| 2018-10-13 || Win ||align=left| Yuruk Metin || 2018 WAKO World Championship, Quarterfinal || Bratislava, Slovakia || Decision (3:0) || 3 || 2:00
|-
| colspan=9 | Legend''':

References 

1997 births
Living people
Sportspeople from Cherkasy
Ukrainian male kickboxers
Competitors at the 2022 World Games
World Games bronze medalists
21st-century Ukrainian people